The National Assembly Building is the first purpose-built meeting place of the National Assembly (國會, Guóhuì) of the Republic of China in Beijing. It was designed by Curt Rothkegel (1876-1945), a German architect based in Qingdao. Rothkegel had made earlier (and grander) designs for a Parliament Building commissioned by the late Qing Dynasty, whose construction was started in 1910 on the site of today's Beijing International Hotel on East Chang'an Avenue, but was left unfinished at the time of the Xinhai Revolution in 1911. The building was used intermittently for sessions of the National Assembly during its troubled history from the aftermath of China's first national election to the Beijing Coup in October 1924.

The National Assembly Building is now part of the compound of Xinhua News Agency in central Beijing. Xinhua restored it and uses it for events. The Xinhua History Exhibition Hall, an in-house museum, is located in nearby Republican-era brick buildings. The National Assembly building is not open to the public.

References

See also
National Assembly (Republic of China)
Nanjing Great Hall of the People
Great Hall of the People

Buildings and structures in Beijing
Government buildings in China
Legislative buildings in China
Government buildings completed in 1913
Seats of national legislatures
1913 establishments in China